Casa by the Sea was a private residential school/residential treatment center in Ensenada, Baja California, Mexico. It was operated by the World Wide Association of Specialty Programs and Schools (WWASPS) and primarily enrolled teenagers from the United States who had behavioral issues.

The facility was closed by Mexican government child-protective authorities on September 10, 2004. The U.S. Consulate General's office in Tijuana reported that the concerns that led to the closure included lack of evidence that school employees possessed necessary diplomas or professional licenses, presence at the facility of expired medications for students, and unauthorized use of a pharmacy. At the time of the closure there were 538 students enrolled. After the closure, U.S. Congressman George Miller said this was "the ninth closing of a facility owned or managed by the World Wide Association of Specialty Programs," and urged the U.S. State Department to take action regarding the abuse of American children at WWASPS facilities outside the country.

Notable alumni
 Convicted murderer Michael James Perry, who was executed in Texas in 2010, had been enrolled in Casa by the Sea, but left in 2000 before completing the program.

References

External links
Archived homepage

Ensenada, Baja California
Boarding schools in Mexico
Behavior modification
Child abuse-related organizations
Educational institutions disestablished in 2004
World Wide Association of Specialty Programs and Schools